Afghanistan competed at the 2016 Asian Beach Games held in Danang, Vietnam from 24 September to 3 October 2016

Competitors

Notes

Medal by Date

Medalists

References

2016 in Afghan sport
Nations at the 2016 Asian Beach Games
Afghanistan at the Asian Beach Games